Richmond Oval may refer to:

Richmond Olympic Oval, in the Canadian city of Richmond, near Vancouver, British Columbia
Richmond Oval (South Australia), in the Adelaide suburb of Richmond